The Sulphur Well Historic District is an  historic district in Sulphur Well, Kentucky which was listed on the National Register of Historic Places in 1998.

It is roughly bounded by Wister Wallace Rd., the southern fork of the Little Barren River, Mitchell-Edwards Rd., and Kentucky Route 70.  The listing included 37 contributing buildings, a contributing structure, and five contributing sites.

According to its nomination, "Sulphur Well is a good example of a. small rural mineral water town in western Kentucky that developed between 1860 and 1949."

References

Historic districts on the National Register of Historic Places in Kentucky
Buildings and structures completed in 1860
National Register of Historic Places in Metcalfe County, Kentucky
1860 establishments in Kentucky
Spa towns